Burns and Carlin at the Playboy Club Tonight is the 1963 first and only album by the short-lived comedy duo of Jack Burns and George Carlin. The album's title is technically a slight exaggeration, because the album was actually recorded at a club named Cosmo Alley in Hollywood, California; not at the Playboy Club. It was recorded in May 1960 but was not released until 1963.

By the time of the album's release, Burns and Carlin had already split up amicably in 1962 to pursue separate endeavors, and the rights of the album were given to Carlin as his first album. Burns teamed with Avery Schreiber and the duo were a successful comedy act until their breakup in 1974. Carlin continued to perform stand-up and record comedy albums until his death in 2008.

The album has been re-issued twice, both with alternate track listings: in 1972 as The Original George Carlin and again in 1981 as Killer Carlin (which itself was re-issued on CD in 1995).

Track listings

1963: Burns and Carlin at the Playboy Club Tonight

1972: The Original George Carlin

1981: Killer Carlin 
Track list is the same for the CD re-release of Killer Carlin in 1995.

References 

1960s comedy albums
1960s spoken word albums
1963 debut albums
George Carlin albums
Jack Burns albums